Jonathan Zimmerman is a historian of education who is a Professor of History of Education at the University of Pennsylvania Graduate School of Education.

Zimmerman graduated from Columbia College in 1983, where he was the editor-in-chief of Columbia Daily Spectator. He earned an M.A. in history in 1990, and a Ph.D. in history in 1993, both from Johns Hopkins University. He taught for 20 years at New York University, where he was chair of the Department of Humanities and Social Sciences in NYU’s Steinhardt School of Culture, Education, and Human Development.

Though being a social liberal, he champions unrestricted freedom of speech for all, including conservatives.

Works

References

External links
 Jonathan Zimmerman | Washington Monthly
 Jonathan Zimmerman | The New York Review of Books

Year of birth missing (living people)
Living people
Historians of education
Columbia College (New York) alumni
Johns Hopkins University alumni
New York University faculty
University of Pennsylvania faculty